Çavuşlu  is a belde (town) in Görele district of Giresun Province, Turkey. The population of the town was  2,451 as of 2018. There are Roman  ruins around the town. According to two conflicting theories about the origin of the  present population, the town was founded either by the Chuvash people (a Turkic people in Russia) who escaped from Timur in the 14th century or by Turkmen tribe named Çuvaz from south Iran.

References

Populated places in Giresun Province
Towns in Turkey
Görele District
Populated coastal places in Turkey